In plastics processing, dip molding is a process of shaping of plastics by moulding. The coating of components with PVC has many applications. Plastic dip moulding is a technique where metal parts are coated with a plastic vinyl material. It is used to protect and make the metal parts more resistant to scratches and abrasions.

Applications 
The main applications are the gloves, balloons, bellows...

Materials 
Plastisol is the most used material for dip moulding because it is easy to use and affordable. Other materials are used, such as latex, leneoprene, polyurethanes, silicones and even epoxy.

Operating Mode 
The plastic can be heated or not according to their physical state at room temperature. In the case of a powder, the plastic is fluidized.

The following steps constitute the dip moulding process:
 mould heating;
 heated mould dipped into the plastic material;
 removal of the mould;
 excess drainage;
 drying or curing of the plastics material still attached to the mould if it contained a solvent or was based reagents (monomers, prepolymers) reagents;
 cooling of the plastic still attached to the mould;
 releasing of the part from the mold after its solidification.
The part may need to be submerged several times to give the desired thickness.

Control of the thickness 
To control the thickness of the workpiece, it is important to control the following settings:
 the mould temperature: higher the temperature, higher the thickness of the workpiece.
 the temperature of the material;
 the speed dipping of the mould;
 the duration of the immersion: this time increases the thickness of the workpiece.
 the output speed of the mould: this speed increases the thickness of the workpiece.

Advantages and disadvantages 
Dip moulding presents advantages and disadvantages.

Advantages 
 low investment cost
 low cost of production
 different possible thicknesses without the need to change the mold
 complex parts can be removed easily from the mold thanks to their elasticity

Disadvantages 
 relatively slow process
 control of the thickness is difficult

See also 
 Dip-coating

References

Plastics industry